Yury Smyslov (14 April 1920 – 1991) was a Soviet equestrian. He competed in two events at the 1960 Summer Olympics.

References

External links
 

1920 births
1991 deaths
Russian male equestrians
Soviet male equestrians
Olympic equestrians of the Soviet Union
Equestrians at the 1960 Summer Olympics
Sportspeople from Yaroslavl